Shannon Kim Brooks Santos (born 24 June 1991) is an American-born Guatemalan former footballer who has played as a defender. She has been a member of the Guatemala women's national team.

Early life
Brooks was raised in Monrovia, California.

International career
Brooks capped for Guatemala at senior level during the 2010 CONCACAF Women's World Cup Qualifying qualification, the 2010 Central American and Caribbean Games and the 2012 CONCACAF Women's Olympic Qualifying Tournament.

See also
List of Guatemala women's international footballers

References

1991 births
Living people
People with acquired Guatemalan citizenship
Guatemalan women's footballers
Women's association football defenders
Guatemala women's international footballers
Competitors at the 2010 Central American and Caribbean Games
American women's soccer players
Soccer players from California
Sportspeople from Los Angeles County, California
People from Monrovia, California
American people of Guatemalan descent
American sportspeople of North American descent
Sportspeople of Guatemalan descent
North Dakota State Bison women's soccer players